Leweston may refer to:

Leweston, Dorset, England, the location of Leweston School
Leweston, Pembrokeshire, a location in Wales
Catherston Leweston, Dorset, England
John Leweston, an English politician